The 2013 UCI Road World Championships took place in Tuscany, Italy, between 22 and 29 September 2013.

The Championships consisted of 12 events for elite, under-23 and junior cyclists. It was the 86th Road World Championships, the 13th in Italy and the first time that the event took place in Tuscany. The different events finished near the Nelson Mandela Forum in Florence. Host cities for the starts were Florence, Pistoia, Lucca and Montecatini Terme.

Marketing

Tickets for crucial points of the course in Florence and Fiesole could be bought in advance. Ticket prices ranged from 20 Euro to 100 Euro for seating near the finish line of the men's road race. Related to the Championships, many events were organized including expositions, exhibitions, a cyclosportive, and the Bicycle Film Festival. Poste italiane made a stamp dedicated to the Championships in 3.290,000 pieces and Chianti Classico produced wine bottles with special Championships labels.

Mascot Pinocchio
The organizers showed the mascot for the event, Pinocchio the brainchild of Florentine writer Carlo Collodi, on 26 October 2012. The wooden figure is dressed in a rainbow sweater and a hat with the same motif. The choice of Pinocchio, whose nose grows when he lies, appeared to be significant after the cycling world was rocked by the doping case of Lance Armstrong. The decision for the mascot however, was taken much earlier according to the organizers.

Traveling
To promote the public transport, more trains ran during the Championships to Florence and a special ticket was produced to ride on all regional trains. For safety reasons, all schools in Fiesole were closed on 27 and 28 September, because reaching schools was complicated.

Schedule

Events summary

Elite events

Ellen van Dijk from the Netherlands, who won a gold medal in the women's team time trial, won her second gold medal in the women's time trial. Van Dijk won with an advantage of 24 seconds over Linda Villumsen, who finished on the podium for the fourth successive Championships. Van Dijk became the second Dutch woman to win in the discipline, after Leontien van Moorsel's victories in 1998 and 1999. Tony Martin, who also won with his team a gold medal in the team time trial, won his third successive men's time trial gold medal, beating main rivals Bradley Wiggins and Fabian Cancellara. In the last weekend of the championships, Marianne Vos won her third gold and her eighth medal in the women's road race. On the last day of the Championships, Rui Costa from Portugal won the rain-soaked Men's road race as he beat Spain's Joaquim Rodríguez by a bike-length on the finish line, with Alejandro Valverde from Spain taking bronze.

Under-23 events

Junior events
After winning the women's junior time trial at the European Championships, Séverine Eraud won the women's junior time trial at the Road World Championships. European runner-up Igor Decraene won the gold medal in the men's junior time trial. In the women's junior road race won Amalie Dideriksen the sprint from Alexandria Nicholls and Alexandra Manly. The three riders escaped with one other rider on the first lap. Mathieu van der Poel won the men's junior road race. He attacked in the closing stage and soloed to the finish. It was van der Poel's first road world title, having previously won two junior world titles in cyclo-cross, in 2012 and 2013.

Participating nations
76 nations participated. Two riders from Uganda were on the start list for the men's and women's time trial but did not start. One rider from Iran was registered for the women's team time trial, but did not start. The number of cyclists per nation (exclusive riders in the team time trials) is shown in parentheses.

Medal table

Team time trials are included under the UCI registration country of the team.

Prize money

The UCI assigned premiums in all of the twelve events.

Broadcasting

 Australia: SBS 2 (Internet Broadcast)
 Belgium: Canvas, Eén, La Deux
 Brazil: SporTV
 Canada: Rogers Sportsnet, RDS
 China: CCTV
 Colombia: RCN, Win Sports
 Czech Republic: ČT Sport
 Denmark: TV3+, TV3 Sport 1 (Internet Broadcast)
 France: France 3, beIN Sport
 Hungary: Sport 1
 Israel: Sport 1
 Italy: Rai Sport 2, Rai 3
 Middle East: Al Jazeera
 Japan: NHK BS 1, NHK
 Netherlands: NOS
 Norway: Viasat 4, Viasat Sport
 Pan Asia: Eurosport Asia/Pacific
 Poland: Polsat Sport
 Slovakia: Dvojka
 Slovenia: RTV Slovenia
 South Africa: SuperSport
 South America: Direct TV, TDN
 Sweden: TV10 / Viasat Sport, Viasat 14 HD
 Switzerland: RSI, RTS, SRF
 United Kingdom: BBC Television (Internet Broadcast)
 United States: Universal Sports (Internet Broadcast)
 Worldwide: UCI YouTube channel (Internet Broadcast)
Source

References

External links

 
 Event information and results at the UCI website.

 
UCI Road World Championships by year
World Championships
UCI Road World Championships
Sport in Tuscany
2013 in men's road cycling
2013 in women's road cycling
International cycle races hosted by Italy